Granulifusus monsecourorum is a species of sea snail, a marine gastropod mollusk in the family Fasciolariidae, the spindle snails, the tulip snails and their allies.

Description
The length of the shell attains 12.2 mm.

Distribution
This marine species occurs off Madagascar.

References

 Hadorn R. & Fraussen K. 2005. Revision of the genus Granulifusus Kuroda & Habe 1954 with description of some new species (Gastropoda: Prosobranchia: Fasciolariidae). Archiv für Molluskenkunde 134 (2): 129–171.

monsecourorum
Gastropods described in 2005